I Wanna Do It With a Donna is a single released on vinyl in 2003 by Australian deathgrind/rock band Blood Duster and was the second single to be released from their self-titled album.

The 7" was released by the band themselves, on their own label B.A.F. Records, in a limited edition pressing of 1000. The record was pressed onto white vinyl, each copy being hand-numbered and coming with a poster sleeve.

The single launch was held at the Tote Hotel, in Melbourne, on October 20, 2003.

Songs

"I Wanna Do It With a Donna" is a song about stalking the all-female band The Donnas, a deliberate parody of The Androids' 2002 #4 Australian hit "Do It with Madonna". The track features guest vocals from Melbourne all-female band The Spazzys. AllMusic's Stewart Mason reviewed the album and opined that it was "the group's most gleefully tasteless release yet, combining dead-on potshots at the mainstream punk scene (the almost Dickies-like 'IWannaDoItWithADonna'...)". An Encyclopedia Metallum reviewer felt that it was one of "the occasional more accessible songs which are more concerned with having a coherent tune to the guitars instead of rampant tremolo". Blistering's Justin Donnelly noticed that "The second single from the album comes in ‘IWannaDoItWithADonna’. With backing vocal help from The Spazzys, there’s plenty of potential chart wise on offer here."

The song on the flipside is a cover of the Turbonegro song "Midnight NAMBLA". It was re-released in 2017 on the band's farewell release, a rarities compilation entitled All the Remains.

Track listing 
Side 1:
 "I Wanna Do It With a Donna"
Side 2:
 "Midnight NAMBLA"

Personnel
Jason Fuller - bass
Matt Rizzo - drums
Matt Collins - guitar, vocals
Scott Pritchard - guitar, vocals
Tony Forde - vocals

Guest appearances
 The Spazzys – Guest vocals on side 1

References 

Blood Duster songs
2003 songs
Death metal songs